Cañada de Benatanduz is a municipality located in the province of Teruel, Aragon, Spain. According to the 2004 census (INE), the municipality had a population of 64 inhabitants.
It is located in the Sierra de la Cañada of the Iberian System.

References 

Municipalities in the Province of Teruel
Maestrazgo